Sinister Slaughter is the second full-length album by American death metal band Macabre and was released in 1993 by Nuclear Blast Records. The cover artwork is a parody on the Beatles album Sgt. Pepper's Lonely Hearts Club Band featuring the band members, serial killers and mass murderers instead of famous people. The album was re-released in 2000 in a digipak that included the songs off the Behind the Wall of Sleep EP as bonus tracks.

Track listing
 "Nightstalker"  – 2:04 – Richard Ramirez
 "The Ted Bundy Song"  – 1:18 – Ted Bundy
 "Sniper in the Sky"  – 1:51 – Charles Whitman
 "Montreal Massacre"  – 1:25 – Marc Lépine
 "Zodiac"  – 3:46 – Zodiac Killer
 "James Pough, What the Hell Did You Do?!"  – 2:09 – James Edward Pough
 "The Boston Strangler"  – 1:10 – Albert DeSalvo
 "Mary Bell"  – 0:43 – Mary Bell
 "Mary Bell Reprise"  – 0:45 – Mary Bell
 "Killing Spree (Postal Killer)"  – 1:21 – Patrick Sherrill
 "Is It Soup Yet?"  – 1:18 – Daniel Rakowitz
 "White Hen Decapitator"  – 2:30 – Michael Bethke
 "Howard Unrah (What Have You Done Now?!)"  – 2:28 – Howard Unrah
 "Gacy's Lot"  – 2:20 – John Wayne Gacy
 "There Was a Young Man Who Blew up a Plane"  – 2:10 – Jack Gilbert Graham
 "Vampire of Dusseldorf"  – 2:43 – Peter Kürten
 "Shotgun Peterson"  – 2:48 – Christopher Peterson
 "What's that Smell?"  – 3:02 – Jeffrey Dahmer
 "Edmund Kemper Had a Horrible Temper"  – 2:34 – Edmund Kemper
 "What the Heck Richard Speck (Eight Nurses You Wrecked)"  – 2:05 – Richard Speck
 "Albert Was Worse than Any Fish in the Sea"  – 1:31 – Albert Fish

Credits
 Corporate Death – guitars, vocals
 Nefarious – bass guitar, vocals
 Dennis The Menace – drums

References 

1993 albums
Macabre (band) albums
Nuclear Blast albums
Cultural depictions of serial killers